The Battle of Arbedo was fought on 30 June 1422 between the Duchy of Milan and the Swiss Confederation, and ended with a Milanese victory.

In 1419, the Swiss cantons of Uri and Unterwalden bought the fortified town of Bellinzona from the House of Sax but were unable to defend it adequately. When they rejected a Milanese proposal to purchase Bellinzona in 1422, a Milanese force under the command of the condottiero Francesco Bussone da Carmagnola attacked and defeated the Swiss garrison and occupied the town.

The Swiss were mainly equipped with halberds and were initially successful in repelling two Milanese cavalry charges.  Carmagnola then brought up his crossbowmen on the Swiss flanks and ordered his men-at-arms to dismount and fight on foot with their lances, which outreached the halberds. 

The Milanese forced the Swiss back onto a nearby hill, but the appearance of a band of foragers, whom the Milanese mistakenly thought were reinforcements, saved the Swiss from total defeat.  When the Milanese force pulled back to reform, the Swiss withdrew from the battlefield, both sides having taken heavy casualties.

In a historiographical tradition of Zug, the bearer of the cantonal banner, Peter Kälin, was slain, and the banner was taken up by his son, who was slain in his turn. The banner was saved by one Hans Landwing, and was later lost against the French.

The victory secured Bellinzona and the Leventina for the Duchy. In addition, the Duchy regained the Val d'Ossola, thus the Swiss lost all their territorial gains. The defeat discouraged Swiss expansion towards Lake Maggiore for a long time. However, it was this defeat at Arbedo that led to the Swiss increasing the number of pikemen in their armies.

See also
Battles of the Old Swiss Confederacy

Sources
P. Pieri:  Il Rinascimento e la crisi militare italiana
M. Mallett:  Mercenaries and their Masters: Warfare in Renaissance Italy
E. Pometta:  Come il Ticino venne in potere degli Svizzeri. Bellinzona
A. Battistella:  Il conte di Carmagnola

References

Footnotes

Battles involving the Duchy of Milan
Battles involving Switzerland
1422 in Europe
1420s in the Holy Roman Empire
15th century in Italy
Conflicts in 1422